The .40-72 Winchester, also known as .40-72 WCF is a centerfire straight-walled rifle cartridge designed for black powder rather than smokeless powder. It was introduced in 1895 for the Winchester 1895 lever-action rifle.

Description and performance

With the introduction of superior cartridges designed for smokeless powder, the .40-72 Winchester became obsolete and was soon dropped from production. Production of loaded cartridges by Winchester ceased in 1936. 

Besides the Winchester 1895 lever-action, the .40-72 Winchester was chambered in the Winchester 1885 single-shot rifle.

Dimensions

See also
 List of Winchester Center Fire cartridges
 List of cartridges by caliber
 List of rifle cartridges
 .40 S&W
 10mm Auto
 .41 Action Express

References

External links

 40-72 Winchester

Pistol and rifle cartridges
Winchester Repeating Arms Company cartridges
Weapons and ammunition introduced in 1895
Rimmed cartridges